

North America 

By 1948, there were 14 railroads in North America with more than 1000 locomotives in service each.  Twelve were located in the US and two were in Canada.  The total number of steam locomotives and the number of route miles for each railroad in 1948 are given by Bruce (1952).   

Bruce (1952) also reports that by the end of 1949 a total of approximately 29,000 steam locomotives were left on Class I railroads in the United States.

See also

 Timeline of United States railway history
 History of rail transport in the United States
 1948 in rail transport

References 

 Bruce, Alfred W. (1952) The Steam Locomotive in America: Its Development in the Twentieth Century, New York, Bonanza Books, Table 6, plus additional material from text for Canadian Railroads.

Rail transportation in the United States
History of rail transportation in the United States
Rail transport timelines
1940s in rail transport
1948 in rail transport